Pineview is an unincorporated community located in the Barbecue Township of Harnett County, North Carolina, United States.  It is a part of the Dunn Micropolitan Area, which is also a part of the greater Raleigh–Durham–Cary Combined Statistical Area (CSA) as defined by the United States Census Bureau.

The community is centered on the intersection of North Carolina Highway 87 and North Carolina Highway 27.  Pineview  was formerly a great producer of dewberries .

References

Unincorporated communities in Harnett County, North Carolina
Unincorporated communities in North Carolina